William Ives or Bill Ives may refer to:

 William Bullock Ives (1841–1899), Canadian politician; President of the Privy Council and Minister of Trade and Commerce
 William Carlos Ives (1873–1950), Canadian politician
 Bill Ives (rugby league) (1896–1975), Australian rugby league player
 Bill Ives (ice hockey) (born 1941), Canadian ice hockey player
 William Ives (businessman) (1943–2017)
 Grayston Ives or Bill Ives (born 1948), English composer
 Bill Ives (footballer), New Zealand international football (soccer) player

See also
William Ive (disambiguation)